The 1970–71 Liga Leumit season saw Maccabi Netanya win their first title. Maccabi Petah Tikva and Hapoel Holon (in their first and only season in the top division) were both relegated. Eli Ben-Rimoz of Hapoel Jerusalem was the league's top scorer with 20 goals.

Final table

Results

References
Israel - List of final tables RSSSF
Season review at Maccabi Netanya official site 

Liga Leumit seasons
Israel
1970–71 in Israeli football leagues